Robert dos Santos (born 14 March 1988) is a South African-born Portuguese director. Dos Santos initially studied and practiced law before leaving the profession to pursue filmmaking.

Personal life 
Robert dos Santos was born in Johannesburg, South Africa. He initially studied philosophy and law before being admitted and practicing law as an Attorney of the Republic of South Africa before turning to directing.  He is the brother of director Christopher-Lee dos Santos. He reportedly never attended film school.

Career 
Robert dos Santos left law and directed his first commercial, titled Light, which went on to be nominated for the BAFTA qualifying Aesthetica Awards. Dos Santos has directed numerous music videos for Warner Music Group and their artists. 

His first narrative short film, titled A Moment, was shot using a specialized motion control camera rig to accommodate for an unbroken continuous shot which required high speed camera movements and choreography.

Awards 
Robert dos Santos has received over 30 award nominations worldwide including in the United States, United Kingdom, France, Germany, Croatia, South Africa, Brazil, and Australia. His first narrative short film, A Moment, won best film at the Los Angeles Film Awards. He received an honorable mention from the Hollywood New Directors in 2021.

References 

Portuguese film directors
Portuguese screenwriters
South African film directors
South African screenwriters
Male screenwriters
1988 births
Artists from Johannesburg
Living people